Dyffryn Arth is a community in the county of Ceredigion, Wales, and is 66.8 miles (107.5 km) from Cardiff and 178.4 miles (287.1 km) from London. In 2011 the population of Dyffryn Arth was 1174 with 49.7% of them able to speak Welsh. It includes the villages of Aberarth, Pennant, Moelfryn and Cross Inn.

References

See also
List of localities in Wales by population

Communities in Ceredigion